James McNally was an American football player and coach.  He was the head football coach at Fordham University for one season in 1890, compiling a record of 1–3–1.

Head coaching record

References

Year of birth missing
Year of death missing
19th-century players of American football
Fordham Rams football coaches
Fordham Rams football players